Boýnyuzyn  (Russian: Боюн-Узун) is a town and capital of Garaşsyzlyk District in the Lebap Province of  Turkmenistan.

Populated places in Lebap Region